The Burnham and Highbridge Times was a  newspaper, published in Somerset, England.

It was a free weekly for Burnham-on-Sea, Highbridge and outlying communities.

It was owned by Northcliffe Media, part of the Daily Mail and General Trust newsgroup. It closed in 2010.

References

Northcliffe Media
Newspapers published in Somerset
Burnham-on-Sea